Maxi is a discount grocery retailer based in Quebec, Canada. Founded in 1984 by Provigo, it is a division of Loblaw Companies and the largest of Loblaws' Quebec supermarket chains. Maxi is the Quebec equivalent of No Frills, a chain of franchised discount grocery stores outside Quebec, except that Maxi stores are owned by the company. Over 7,000 people are employed at the Maxi and Maxi & Cie stores across Quebec.

History

The first Maxi store opened November 19, 1984 in a former Kmart location in Longueuil. Maxi was intended to be a  larger spinoff version of Provigo's Héritage supermarket chain. By 1987, Maxi had grown to a chain of six locations and three of these stores included a day-care centre for parents to leave their children for up to 90 minutes while shopping.   Throughout the 1980s and early 90s, Maxi used a cartoonish elephant as its mascot, in a move similar to that of its sister chain Héritage which used a kangaroo.          

When Steinberg became defunct in 1992, some of its locations were converted into Maxi stores. In 1993, several Provigo stores (especially the larger ones) were rebranded as Maxi locations. Maxi absorbed the Héritage chain in 1995 to reach a total of 67 locations. 

Maxi became a division of Loblaws following the latter's acquisition of Provigo in 1999. Maxi briefly used to have stores in Ontario, but they were converted to No Frills after Loblaws purchased Provigo. There were 90 Maxi stores and 23 Maxi & Cie in 2017 within the province of Quebec.

Maxi & Cie

The chain's Maxi & Cie/Maxi & Co. locations are larger and carry a wider variety of general merchandise. The first Maxi & Cie opened on September 25, 1996 on Jean-Talon street in Saint-Leonard, Quebec and is still in operation. Some Maxi & Cie outlets are themselves former Maxi stores that were converted because of their larger size.  This includes the original store in Longueuil.

Like with Maxi, Maxi & Co. used to have stores in Ontario, but Maxi & Co. withdrew from Ontario in 1999 after the Loblaws purchase of the chain. The 1999 movie Pushing Tin had a scene at one of the Maxi & Co. stores in Ontario.

See also

No Frills (grocery store)
Provigo
List of supermarket chains in Canada

References

External links
 Official website

Hypermarkets
Loblaw Companies
Retail companies established in 1984
1984 establishments in Quebec
Supermarkets of Canada
Discount stores of Canada